The Cozumel raccoon (Procyon pygmaeus) is a critically endangered species of island raccoon endemic on Cozumel Island off the coast of the Yucatan Peninsula, Mexico. It is also called the pygmy raccoon, dwarf raccoon, Cozumel Island raccoon, and Cozumel raccoon bear.

Classification
Clinton Hart Merriam first described the Cozumel raccoon as morphologically distinctive from its mainland relative, the common raccoon subspecies Procyon lotor hernandezii, in 1901. Since then, other scientists have generally agreed with Merriam's assessment, especially Kristofer Helgen and Don E. Wilson, who have dismissed this classification for the other four island raccoons in their studies in 2003 and 2005. Therefore, the Cozumel raccoon was listed as the only distinct species of the genus Procyon besides the common raccoon and the crab-eating raccoon in the third edition of Mammal Species of the World. An archeological study showed that Maya from Cozumel used raccoons of reduced stature, which suggests that the size reduction of this raccoon is not a recent phenomenon.

No true fossils of the species are known, although skeletons have been found at some archeological sites on the island. Cozumel island itself separated from the mainland during the late Pleistocene, so that the species is unlikely to be older than 122,000 years. Data from molecular clock studies implies a divergence date from the common raccoon of anywhere between 26,000 and 69,000 years ago.

Description

Merriam described the Cozumel raccoon as being markedly smaller, both externally and cranially and easy to distinguish from the common raccoon because of its "broad black throat band and golden yellow tail, short posteriorly expanded and rounded nasals and peculiarities of the teeth". Its reduced teeth point to a long period of isolation.

Apart from its smaller size and more rounded snout, the Cozumel raccoon is similar in appearance to the common raccoon. The fur over the upper body is buff-grey ticked with occasional black hairs, while the underparts and legs are pale buff in color. The top of the head lacks the buff tinge of the rest of the body, and has a grizzled grey coloration, contrasting with the white fur of the muzzle and chin, and with the black "mask" pattern around the eyes. A line of brownish-grey fur runs down the middle of the snout, joining the "mask" patterns on either side. The tail is yellowish, with six or seven black or brown rings that become fainter on the underside. In males, the scruff of the neck has a patch of relatively bright, orange fur.

This represents an example of insular dwarfism, and the animals are, on average, about 18% shorter and 45% lighter than the subspecies of common raccoon found on the local mainland, P. lotor shufeldti. Cozumel raccoons also exhibit sexual dimorphism, with the males being around 20% heavier than the females.

Distribution and habitat
According to the IUCN Red List, this species is considered critically endangered. In fact, they report that only about 250–300 individuals are left on the planet. These raccoons are so extremely endangered because of their small geographic range. Cozumel Island supports several other carnivores, including the dwarf coati (Nasua narica nelsoni) and dwarf gray fox (Urocyon sp.). Islands usually lack terrestrial mammals, especially carnivores, making the Cozumel raccoon and the others unique.

On the island, the raccoon inhabits a range of habitats, but is primarily limited to the mangrove forests and sandy wetlands in the northwest tip of the island.  However, it has also been captured in semi-evergreen forests and agricultural lands surrounding these preferred habitats., and in the Punta Sur ecological park at the south end of the island.

Behavior
Relatively little is known about the group size of the raccoons.  They are primarily nocturnal and solitary animals, but may sometimes form family groups possibly consisting of the mother and cubs.

However, individuals do not appear to defend territories to any great extent, and their close relative, the common raccoon, can exist at very high densities when food is abundant. Although there have been no detailed studies of their reproductive habits, females seem to give birth primarily between November and January, possibly with a second litter during the summer months.

Diet
The habitat specificity of Cozumel raccoons is in large part due to the type of foods they consume.  Their overall diet consists of crabs, fruit, frogs, lizards, and insects.  They are a generalist omnivore, but crabs make up over 50% of their diet.  Their diet is somewhat seasonal.  During the wet season, fruit and vegetation are more abundant and become a large portion of the raccoons' diet.  Then in the dry season, they begin to consume more of the crabs, insects, lizards, etc.  Crabs comprising more than half the food they eat could have an effect on their limited distribution: they stay near the water where crabs are abundant.

Morphological specializations
A large amount of research has been performed to determine whether the Cozumel raccoon is indeed a separate species from the common raccoon.  Cuaron et al. (2004) reported that research conducted by many different scholars concludes that they are separate species.  Body size and cranium size have been reported to be smaller in P. pygmaeus, hence the name pygmy.  Other morphological differences include a broad black throat band, golden yellow tail and reduced teeth; "these and other characteristics point to a long period of isolation".

Conservation status
Island carnivores at the top of the food chain often become extinct soon after the arrival of humans. The main danger to the Cozumel raccoon is development of Cozumel island due to the tourism industry.  Because the raccoons are only located in a small coastal area at the northwest corner of the island- an area covered for development- the effects of habitat loss are especially severe.  There are no laws protecting the raccoons and also no land set aside for them.

Newer threats to their survival that have been researched in recent years are diseases and parasites.  Cozumel has a population of feral cats and domestic cats and dogs that can transmit diseases to the raccoons.  On average, there are about two different parasite species present in each host.  That is not overall abundance, but simply the absolute number of species found.  Some captured raccoons had developed antibodies to certain diseases.  Cats are only newly introduced on the island due to humans bringing them as pets.

Conservation actions
One conservation approach would be to reduce or even eliminate human impact on the mangrove forests, especially in the northwest corner of the island.  This would constitute the halting of development in this area and to establish protected land for the raccoons.  This land to be set aside would include the habitat that is crucial to the survival of the species, most importantly the mangrove forests and surrounding semi-evergreen forests.

Another method that could help to restore the populations is captive breeding techniques.  If they willingly reproduce in captivity as the common raccoons do, it could be used successfully. Additionally, the arrival of pets, especially feral cats, brought more diseases and parasites that are having a significant effect on the raccoons.  The best method of reducing these impacts is to remove as many feral cats as possible. For any conservation action to be successful, conservation personnel will need to find a way to compromise with the tourism industry to save the Cozumel raccoons.

Glatston also urged researchers to continue examining the species to assure that the pygmy is a distinct species from its mainland sister taxon.

References

Procyonidae
Endemic fauna of Cozumel
Mammals of Mexico
Carnivorans of North America
Critically endangered biota of Mexico
Critically endangered fauna of North America
Mammals described in 1901
Taxa named by Clinton Hart Merriam